is a Japanese voice actress from Shizuoka Prefecture who is affiliated with 81 Produce. She is known for her roles as Nene Sakura in New Game! and Liones Yelistratova in Hina Logi: from Luck & Logic.

Filmography

Anime TV series

Original video animation (OVA)

Anime films

Video games

References

External links
Official agency profile 

1993 births
Living people
Japanese video game actresses
Japanese voice actresses
Voice actresses from Shizuoka Prefecture
81 Produce voice actors